Krushnashastri Chiplunkar (Devanagari: कृष्णशास्त्री चिपळूणकर) (1824–1878) was a social activist and a Marathi writer from Maharashtra, India.

For some years, he served as a principal of the Teachers' Training College in Pune.

Chiplunkar was a scholar especially in Sanskrit Nyaya (न्याय) (Logic), Dharma (धर्म) (Religion, Law, and Ethics), and Artha (अर्थ) (Economics).

Learning English was not common among Indian scholars of his time, yet he started learning it at age 25, and mastered it along with Sanskrit and Marathi.

He was a leading personality in the city of Pune during his life.

Works
 विचारलहरी (1852)
 सॉक्रेटिसचे चरित्र (1852)
 अर्थशास्त्र परिभाषा (1855)
 संस्कृतभाषेचे लघु व्याकरण (1859)
 पद्यरत्नावली (1865)
 अरबी भाषेतील सुरस व चमत्कारिक गोष्टी (1861)
(Hari Krushna Damle and Krushnashastri's son Vishnushastri Chiplunkar completed the above last book in 1890 after Krushnashastri's death.)

Translations into Marathi
 Samuel Johnson's The History of Rasselas
 Kalidas's Meghadoot (मेघदूत)
 Jagannath Pandit's Karunavilas (करुणाविलास)

References 

Indian independence activists from Maharashtra
Marathi-language writers
1824 births
1878 deaths